The 2019 FEI European Championships was  held in Rotterdam, Netherlands, from 19 to 25 August 2019. Competitions was held in three disciplines; jumping, dressage and para-dressage.

Medalists

Dressage

Jumping

Medals table

References

External links
 Official site

FEI-recognized competition
European
FEI
European Dressage Championships
FEI